This article deals with the Israeli football player, not the Haaretz journalist

Nir Hasson (born 19 December 2001) is an Israeli professional football player who plays as a midfielder for Hapoel Ramat Gan.

References

External links

2001 births
Living people
Israeli footballers
Footballers from Ashdod
F.C. Ashdod players
Hapoel Ashdod F.C. players
Israeli Premier League players
Liga Leumit players
Association football midfielders